The 2010 Madagascar coup d'état attempt was a failed coup attempt against President of the High Transitional Authority of Madagascar Andry Rajoelina on November 17–18, 2010. The coup attempt leaders were ex-Defense Minister Noel Rakotonandrasanana and Colonel Charles Andrianasoaviana, the head of the Special Intervention Force.

References

2010s coups d'état and coup attempts
History of Madagascar
Politics of Madagascar
Attempted coups d'état in Madagascar
November 2010 events in Africa